Amanda Peet (born January 11, 1972) is an American actress. She began her career with small parts on television, and made her feature film debut in Animal Room (1995). Her portrayal of Jill St. Claire in The Whole Nine Yards (2000) brought her wider recognition, and she has since appeared in a variety of films, such as Saving Silverman (2001), High Crimes; Changing Lanes; Igby Goes Down (all 2002), Something's Gotta Give (2003), Identity (2003), Melinda and Melinda (2004), A Lot Like Love (2005), Syriana (2005), Battle for Terra (2007), Martian Child (2008), The X-Files: I Want to Believe (2008), Please Give (2010), Gulliver's Travels (2010), The Way, Way Back (2013), Identity Thief (2013), and Trust Me (2013).

On television, Peet starred as Jacqueline Barrett on The WB's Jack & Jill (1999–2001), as Tina Morris on HBO's Togetherness (2015–2016), as Jules on IFC's Brockmire (2016–2020), and as Betty Broderick on the second season of Dirty John in 2020. She wrote and co-executive produced the Netflix series The Chair that was released in 2021.

Early life
Peet was born in New York City, the daughter of Penny (née Levy), a social worker, and Charles Peet Jr., a corporate lawyer, who later divorced. Her father is a Quaker and her mother is Jewish; both are also atheists. Peet's maternal great-grandfathers were Samuel Levy, a lawyer, businessman, and public official, who served as Manhattan Borough President; and Samuel Roxy Rothafel, a theatrical impresario and entrepreneur.

At age seven, Peet relocated with her family to London, returning to New York four years later. Peet attended Friends Seminary, and graduated from Columbia University with a degree in American history. In college, she auditioned for acting with teacher Uta Hagen and decided to become an actress after taking Hagen's class. During her four-year period of study with Hagen, Peet appeared in the off-Broadway revival of Clifford Odets's Awake and Sing! with Stephen Lang.

Career

Early roles and breakthrough (1995–2004)
Peet's first screen performances were in a television commercial for Skittles and an uncredited appearance as the girlfriend of the titular character in the second episode of The Larry Sanders Show in 1992. Her film debut was in the drama Animal Room (1995), which also starred Neil Patrick Harris and Matthew Lillard. She also appeared in the November 1995 episode "Hot Pursuit" of Law and Order. For much of the late 1990s, Peet maintained a steady acting career in relatively obscure independent films co-starring more established actors. In 1996, for instance, she appeared in One Fine Day, with George Clooney and Michelle Pfeiffer, and She's the One, with Jennifer Aniston and Cameron Diaz. Peet appeared in the critically acclaimed film Playing by Heart (1998), as part of an ensemble cast that included Sean Connery, Gillian Anderson, and Ryan Phillippe. She had her first major role as Jacqueline Barrett in the WB network series Jack & Jill, which aired for two seasons, between 1999 and 2001, to moderate success. She appeared in the eighth-season finale of Seinfeld ("The Summer of George") as a waitress whom Jerry Seinfeld meets. In 1999, Peet also starred in the fantasy romantic comedy Simply Irresistible, opposite Sarah Michelle Gellar. That film was panned by critics and flopped at the box office.

Peet appeared alongside Bette Midler and Nathan Lane in Andrew Bergman's Isn't She Great (2000), a highly fictionalized account of the life and career of author Jacqueline Susann.  However, her first role in a widely released feature film came later that year, with the part of Jill St. Claire in the mafia comedy film The Whole Nine Yards.  The film, which also starred Bruce Willis and Matthew Perry, received mixed reviews. Roger Ebert gave it one of the more positive reviews, noting in particular that Peet's performance, which he called "perfect", highlighted the story. The Whole Nine Yards was a commercial success, grossing US$106.3 million worldwide. For her performance, she received a Blockbuster Entertainment Award nomination for Favorite Supporting Actress: Comedy, and a Teen Choice Award nomination for Choice Film Liar. In 2000, she played a love interest in the independent comedy Whipped, won the Young Hollywood Award for "Best New Style Maker", and was voted one of the 50 Most Beautiful People in the World by People magazine.

Peet took on the role of a psychologist and the romantic interest of Jason Biggs in the comedy Saving Silverman (2001), and portrayed a heroin-addicted trophy mistress in the dramedy Igby Goes Down, which garnered acclaim among critics. She also played the wife of a successful, young Wall Street lawyer thriller film Changing Lanes (2002), with Ben Affleck. Also in 2002, she played the sister of Ashley Judd in the suspense thriller High Crimes, in which Judd and co-star Morgan Freeman take on the military's court-martial of Judd's husband for murder. In 2003, Peet appeared with Diane Keaton, Jack Nicholson and Keanu Reeves in the romantic comedy Something's Gotta Give, directed by Nancy Meyers, playing an auctioneer, working for Christie's. The film was a critical darling and a major success at the box office, grossing US$125 million in North America. In her other 2003 film release, the psychological horror thriller Identity, Peet starred as a Las Vegas prostitute, alongside John Cusack, Ray Liotta and John Hawkes. Identity received critical acclaim and was a moderate commercial success. In 2004, Peet starred in The Whole Ten Yards, the sequel to The Whole Nine Yards. Unlike the first film, this production was critically panned and flopped at the box office.

Established career (2005–2010)
Her most significant film role in 2005 was that of a woman who becomes a successful photographer, opposite Ashton Kutcher, in the romantic comedy A Lot Like Love, which revolved around two people whose relationship slowly evolves from lust to friendship to romance over the course of seven years. While overall response was mixed, the  Los Angeles Times found Peet to be "charming and charismatic without being cloying or artificial." In 2005, she also performed in the play This Is How It Goes, filling in for Marisa Tomei at the last minute after six days of rehearsal, and appeared in the Woody Allen's tragicomedy Melinda and Melinda and the thriller Syriana, which was based loosely on former Central Intelligence Agency agent Robert Baer and his memoirs of being an agent in the Middle East.

In 2006, Peet acted on Neil Simon's Broadway production of Barefoot in the Park, followed by the romantic drama Griffin & Phoenix, a remake of the 1976 ABC TV movie, in which she portrayed a terminally ill woman living life to the fullest. The television series Studio 60 on the Sunset Strip, which premiered on NBC in late 2006, featured her as the recently hired president of entertainment programming, with Matthew Perry, with whom she had starred in The Whole Nine Yards and The Whole Ten Yards, and Sarah Paulson, with whom she previously worked in Jack & Jill. For her role, Peet received a Satellite Award nomination for Best Actress – Television Series Drama. Despite being a critical success, the series was cancelled after one season.

Peet starred as an attorney who stays home to raise a new baby in the romantic comedy The Ex (2007), which went unnoticed by critics and audiences. In 2008, she starred in the mystery drama The X-Files: I Want to Believe (2008), as an FBI agent, the dramedy Five Dollars a Day (2008), as the girlfriend of a seemingly successful man, and the crime drama What Doesn't Kill You, as the wife of a Boston criminal. What Doesn't Kill You was her best reviewed film of 2008, with Lisa Schwarzbaum of Entertainment Weekly, writing that Peet "is terrific as Brian's worn-down wife, sick of seeing her man disappear before her eyes."

In 2012 (2009), a disaster film directed by Roland Emmerich, Peet reunited with John Cusack, to play his estranged wife. While critical response was mixed, the film made over US$769 million worldwide, becoming Peet's most widely seen film. In her next film, the dramedy Please Give (2010), she starred as a self-centered cosmetologist, with Catherine Keener and Rebecca Hall. It received a limited theatrical release and critical acclaim. Ethan Alter of Film Journal International felt that Peet "does career-best work here." Peet and the other Please Give cast members received a Gotham Award nomination for Best Ensemble Cast. In 2010, Peet also provided for one of the main characters of DVD sci-fi adventure film Quantum Quest: A Cassini Space Odyssey, and starred as the love interest of the main character in the live-action family adventure film Gulliver's Travels, with Jack Black and Emily Blunt.

Roles in television (2011–2020)
In 2012, Peet headlined the television series Bent, as a recently divorced lawyer. She was drawn to the writing, stating: "I thought it was a good repartee. I love a good romantic comedy, and I love a repressed woman who needs to get laid." However, Bent was canceled after only six episodes. Peet had a recurring role as Capt. Laura Hellinger in seven episodes of the fourth season of The Good Wife (2012–13). In 2013, she made her playwriting debut with The Commons of Pensacola, starring Blythe Danner and Sarah Jessica Parker, and appeared in the film Identity Thief, as the wife of a man whose identity is stolen by a woman, the little-seen comedy Trust Me, as the neighbor of a former child star, and the well received dramedy The Way, Way Back, as one half of a married couple.

From 2015 to 2016, Peet played Tina Morris on the HBO series Togetherness, which focused on the lives of two couples living under the same roof. The show—which was created, written and directed by the Duplass brothers—ran for two seasons, and was praised for its intimate storytelling and the performances of its cast.  IndieWire called it "the upbeat comedy HBO needs right now", and noted that while Lynskey is "the true standout", Peet "won't be short of fans". From 2016 to 2020, Peet appeared in Brockmire, as the owner of a Minor League Baseball team.

Writing and producing (2021–present)
In 2021 Netflix released The Chair, a six-episode comedic dramatic series written by Peet and produced by her, alongside David Benioff and D. B. Weiss.

Other endeavors

Activism
In 2008, Peet volunteered to be a spokeswoman for Every Child By Two (ECBT), a non-profit organization that advocates childhood vaccination. Peet began working with the group after becoming concerned by the "amount of misinformation floating around [about vaccines], particularly in Hollywood." In an interview with Cookie, Peet stated: "Frankly, I feel that parents who don't vaccinate their children are parasites," referring to the benefit unvaccinated children derive from herd immunity and the concern that dropping vaccination rates may put all children at increased risk of preventable disease. Peet's comments stirred controversy; in response, she apologized for using the term "parasites," but affirmed her position on the importance and safety of vaccinations.

The 3rd Annual Independent Investigative Group IIG Awards recognizing the promotion of science in popular media was held on May 18, 2009. The IIG presented an award to Peet for her work campaigning for vaccines.

Writing
Peet has co-written a children's book Dear Santa, Love, Rachel Rosenstein about a Jewish girl during the Christmas season. The book was launched in 2015.

Peet also wrote a play Our Very Own Carlin McCullough, which ran for two months in 2018 at the Geffen Playhouse in Los Angeles to positive reviews.

Personal life
Peet married screenwriter David Benioff, son of former Goldman Sachs CEO and chairman Stephen Friedman, on September 30, 2006, in New York City. They have three children. The family lives in Manhattan and Beverly Hills.

Peet is a friend of actor Peter Dinklage, who starred in her husband's series Game of Thrones and whom she had met years earlier through friends at Bennington College.

In 2008, Peet revealed that she has struggled with postpartum depression and that she has ADHD.

Filmography

Film

Television

Awards and nominations

References

External links

 
 
 
 

1972 births
Living people
Actresses from New York City
American film actresses
American stage actresses
American television actresses
Jewish American actresses
People from Manhattan
Columbia College (New York) alumni
20th-century American actresses
21st-century American actresses
Friends Seminary alumni
21st-century American Jews